Draghetti is a surname. Notable people with the surname include:

Marinella Draghetti (born 1961), Italian basketball player
Roberto Draghetti (1960–2020), Italian actor and voice actor

Italian-language surnames